Caenocoris is a genus of ground bugs in the insect family Lygaeidae.

Species
Species within this genus include:
 Caenocoris botoltobagensis Esaki, 1931 
 Caenocoris croceosignatus Breddin, 1901 
 Caenocoris fuscipennis (Guerin, 1838) 
 Caenocoris nerii (Germar, 1847) - Oleander Bug 
 Caenocoris pilosulus (Germar, 1837) 
 Caenocoris simillimus Horvath, 1924

References

Pentatomomorpha genera
Lygaeidae